Randy K. Lippert is Professor of Criminology at University of Windsor. He received his Ph.D. from the University of British Columbia.  He has published twelve books and 95 journal articles and book chapters mostly focused on sanctuary practices, security, surveillance, crime prevention, condominia, business improvement districts, and public policing.  He is best known for his condominium, sanctuary, policing/security and urban research and for theoretical contributions to refining governmentality perspectives that were inspired by the later writings and lectures of Michel Foucault.

References

Canadian criminologists
People from Windsor, Ontario
Year of birth missing (living people)
Living people